Bill Slavicsek is a game designer who served as the Director of Roleplaying Design and Development at Wizards of the Coast. He previously worked for West End Games and TSR, Inc., and designed products for Dungeons & Dragons, Star Wars, Alternity, Torg, Paranoia and Ghostbusters.

Biography

Early life
Bill Slavicsek was born and raised in New York City. Slavicsek was a comic book, horror, and science fiction fan as a boy: "Some of my earliest memories involve looking at issues of Marvel Comics, drawing my own comics, and watching old SF and horror movies on TV". Interested in gaming from an early age, Slavicsek was introduced to roleplaying games in 1977 when he discovered Dungeons & Dragons. Originally intending to pursue a career as a comic book artist, Slavicsek switched to journalism and communication at St. John's University.

West End Games
After working for a year at a community newspaper, Slavicsek was hired by West End Games as an editor in 1986. In 1987 the company secured the license to publish a Star Wars roleplaying game, a project which Slavicsek oversaw as an editor and developer. Slavicsek oversaw the Star Wars line for its first year. In 1988 he was promoted to Creative and Editorial Director for WEG. He co-created the Torg game with Greg Gorden, published in 1990, and co-authored the novel Stormknights, which was set in the Torg universe. Slavicsek left West End later in 1990.

TSR
In 1991, Slavicsek began working as a freelancer, and was hired as a designer/editor by TSR in 1993. At TSR, he designed the Alternity game with Rich Baker, as well as the Revised Dark Sun Campaign Setting, and The Nightmare Lands for the Ravenloft setting.

For much of the 1990s he was working simultaneously for both WEG and TSR as an editor and designer on various projects. He wrote A Guide to the Star Wars Universe, a definitive reference to Star Wars movies, books, and games, which was published by Del Rey in 1994. Slavicsek is considered one of the world's leading experts on Star Wars, and has written the second and third editions of A Guide to the Star Wars Universe.

Wizards of the Coast
By the end of 1997, Slavicsek was the Director of the TSR Product Group for Wizards of the Coast; that job was later divided in two, making him the Director of Roleplaying Game design. Peter Adkison selected Slavicsek to be the head of RPG research and development. Richard Baker and Slavicsek designed the Alternity sci-fi RPG for TSR to replace their Amazing Engine game, and Wizards published the game in 1997. Peter Adkison left the third edition Dungeons & Dragons design work to Slavicsek and a group of ex-TSR employees. In December 2000, Hasbro told Wizards to cut 10% of their staff; Slavicsek was the "Director of Category" overseeing a team of about 60 people, and opted to close down the L.A. office of Last Unicorn Games. By the time of the publication of the d20 edition of the Star Wars Roleplaying Game in 2000, Slavicsek held the title of Vice President and Director of RPG R&D for Wizards of the Coast. The Eberron Campaign Setting (2004) was produced by Keith Baker alongside James Wyatt and Slavicsek. As the Director of R&D for Dungeons & Dragons, Slavicsek began thinking about a fourth edition of D&D as early as 2005, when he organized a team to work on some early designs, headed by Rob Heinsoo and also containing Andy Collins and James Wyatt. Slavicsek and Mike Mearls designed the Castle Ravenloft Board Game (2010). Slavicsek announced his departure from Wizards of the Coast on June 23, 2011.

After Wizards of the Coast
Slavicsek became a writer and content designer at ZeniMax Online Studios, which developed and released The Elder Scrolls Online MMORPG.

Selected bibliography

Novels
 The Mark of Nerath (2010)

Media appearances
Bill Slavicsek has appeared in the following newspaper and magazine articles, websites and podcasts.

Podcasts
 RPG Countdown: 11 March 2009 "Dungeon Delve"
 Never Tell Me the Pods: 21 September 2016 "Episode 25 - May The Source Be With You (Bill Slavicsek)"

References

External links
 RPG Database Pen & Paper
West End Games

1971 births
21st-century American male writers
21st-century American novelists
American male novelists
Dungeons & Dragons game designers
Living people
Novelists from New York (state)
Writers from New York City